David Arquette (born September 8, 1971) is an American actor and former professional wrestler. He is best known for his role as Dewey Riley in the slasher film franchise Scream, for which he won a Teen Choice Award and two Blockbuster Entertainment Awards. As a professional wrestler, he is best remembered for his 2000 stint in World Championship Wrestling (WCW), where he won the WCW World Heavyweight Championship and headlined the Slamboree pay-per-view event; he has received praise in recent times for his work on the independent circuit.

A member of the Arquette acting family, he first became known during the mid-1990s after starring in several Hollywood films aside from the Scream franchise, such as Wild Bill, Never Been Kissed, Buffy the Vampire Slayer, See Spot Run and Eight Legged Freaks. He has since had several television roles, such as Jason Ventress on ABC's In Case of Emergency. Arquette has also voiced Skully on the Disney Channel animated series Jake and the Never Land Pirates, and executive produced the game show Celebrity Name Game, for which he received a Daytime Emmy Award nomination.

Early life
Arquette was born in a Subud commune in Bentonville, Virginia. He is the youngest child of Brenda "Mardi" Olivia (née Nowak), an actress, poet, theatre operator, activist, acting teacher, and therapist, and Lewis Arquette, an actor. Arquette's paternal grandfather was comedian Cliff Arquette. Arquette's mother was Jewish (from a family that emigrated from Poland) while his father was a convert from Catholic Christianity to Islam; through him, David is distantly related to explorer Meriwether Lewis. His father, whose family's surname was originally Arcouet, was of part French-Canadian descent. Arquette's four siblings, Rosanna, Richmond, Patricia, and Alexis, all became actors as well. The Arquettes had an unusual upbringing, with a father who occasionally had issues with substance abuse. Their mother died of breast cancer.

Career

Acting career 
Arquette appeared in a number of movies in the 1990s, including Buffy the Vampire Slayer (1992), Airheads (1994) and Never Been Kissed (1999). He had guest spots on television shows like Blossom (1992), Beverly Hills, 90210 (1992) and Friends (1996). Arquette achieved his biggest success in the horror/slasher film franchise Scream. It was during the filming of the first film in 1996 that he first met his future wife, Courteney Cox. The couple married in 1999; together, they appeared in a 2003 advertisement for Coke and formed the production company Coquette (both a portmanteau of their last names and a word meaning a flirty woman), which has produced a number of films and television series, including Daisy Does America, Dirt and Cougar Town. Arquette guest starred alongside Cox on Cougar Town in 2012.

Arquette appeared in the Sega video game ESPN NFL 2K5, voicing himself as a "celebrity adversary" and manager of his own team, the Los Angeles Locos, as well as appearing as an unlockable character in Season Mode. He also appeared in the 2001 EA video game SSX Tricky, as the voice of lead character Eddie. He also starred in See Spot Run in 2001. Arquette starred in the 2007 ABC comedy series In Case of Emergency, which was canceled after one season. Since then, he has appeared in the 2008 film Hamlet 2 and reprised his role in Scream 4, again acting alongside Cox. He appeared alongside his sister in the TV show Medium in January 2011.

He appeared in Rascal Flatts' music video for their song "Why Wait" in 2010. Arquette, a well known horror fan, made his directorial debut with 2007's The Tripper and has signed on to direct Glutton, a 3D psychological thriller. The film began shooting in July 2011 in Canada. Arquette appeared on the 13th season of Dancing with the Stars, partnered with two-time champion Kym Johnson. He was eliminated on November 1, 2011. On October 7, 2013, Arquette's new show Dream School, in which he plays a mentor to high risk kids in L.A., premiered on the Sundance Channel. In 2017, he starred in the reboot of Sigmund and the Sea Monsters as Captain Barnabus. In May 2020, it was confirmed that Arquette would be reprising his role as Dewey Riley for the fifth Scream film, which was directed by Matt Bettinelli-Olpin and Tyler Gillett. The film was released on January 14, 2022.

Professional wrestling career 

In 2000, after filming the World Championship Wrestling (WCW) movie Ready to Rumble, Arquette was brought into WCW storylines. He made his first appearance on the April 12, 2000, episode of Thunder, sitting in the crowd before leaping into the ring to take part in a worked confrontation with Eric Bischoff and his New Blood stable. Afterwards, he formed an alliance with Chris Kanyon and then reigning WCW World Heavyweight Champion Diamond Dallas Page, and with their help, he defeated Bischoff in a singles match on the April 24 episode of Nitro. On the following episode of Thunder, Arquette teamed with Page in a match against Bischoff and Jeff Jarrett, with the stipulation that whichever man got the pin would take the championship. Arquette pinned Bischoff again in the match's finish, winning the WCW World Heavyweight Championship in the process.

During his time as champion, Arquette was mostly used as comic relief. He only appeared on two shows as champion, the May 1 Nitro and May 7 Slamboree pay-per-view. During the former, a vignette was shown, filmed on the set of Arquette's film 3000 Miles to Graceland, which also featured his wife Courteney Cox and their co-star Kurt Russell. In the vignette, Cox informs Russell that Arquette is the WCW World Heavyweight Champion, causing Russell to laugh and walk off and Arquette to chase after him with a steel chair. In another portion of the show, Arquette was seen backstage trembling in fear and attempting to "give back" the championship belt. However, he did successfully defend the title against Tank Abbott with help from Page.

Arquette held the title for 12 days until the Slamboree pay-per-view on May 7, 2000, when he was booked to defend the championship against Jarrett and Page in a Triple Cage match, the same match featured in the climax of Ready to Rumble. In the end, he turned on Page and gave the victory to Jarrett. After Slamboree, Arquette cut a promo on the May 8 episode of Nitro, explaining that his entire friendship with Page and title run was a "swerve". Page subsequently ran down to the ring and hit him with a Diamond Cutter. Arquette made one final appearance with WCW at the New Blood Rising pay-per-view on August 13, when he interfered in a match between Buff Bagwell and Kanyon.

Arquette was against the idea of becoming the WCW World Heavyweight Champion, believing that fans like himself would detest a non-wrestler winning the title. Vince Russo, who was the head booker for WCW at the time, insisted that Arquette becoming the champion would be good for the company and for publicity, and Arquette reluctantly agreed to the angle. All the money he made during his WCW tenure was donated to the families of Owen Hart (who died in a freak accident), Brian Pillman (who died from an undiagnosed heart condition), and Darren Drozdov (who became a quadriplegic after an in-ring accident). After the World Wrestling Federation/World Wrestling Entertainment (WWF/WWE) purchased WCW, Arquette's championship run was listed as the top reason for the "failure" of Nitro in a list published by WWE Magazine. Gene Okerlund stated in a 2009 interview on WCW's history that "once Arquette won the title, it might as well been thrown in the trash" due to losing what little credibility it had left at that point, and Arquette's reign as champion has been criticized in other WWE media in the years since, despite the fact that the then-WWF itself briefly booked Vince McMahon as WWF Champion months before Arquette's title win.

On the December 13, 2010, episode of Raw, Arquette made his WWE debut by teaming with Alex Riley in a handicap match against Randy Orton, which they lost. 
In 2018, Arquette said during an interview at The Wendy Williams Show years after his controversial WCW title win he has been trolled for 18 years on the Internet and he wants people to have respect for his name in professional wrestling. He began training with professional wrestler Peter Avalon for his return. On July 15, 2018, Arquette made his return to professional wrestling making his debut for Championship Wrestling from Hollywood (CWFH) in a losing effort against RJ City.

On October 6, 2018, Arquette teamed with RJ City to defeat the team of Halal Beefcake (Idris Abraham and Joe Coleman) in a tag team match at Border City Wrestling's 25th Anniversary show in Windsor, Ontario, Canada. The event was filmed by Impact Wrestling to air as a One Night Only pay-per-view in November 2018. On November 16, 2018, Arquette wrestled Nick Gage in a deathmatch at Joey Janela's LA Confidential event. During the match, he suffered a severe cut in the neck, causing him to bleed profusely. After the match, he went to a hospital and was operated on. Arquette would later state that he was done with deathmatches.

On May 23, 2019, Arquette made his debut on Being the Elite, where he attempted to convince Nick and Matt Jackson to allow him to enter the Over the Budget Battle Royal at AEW Double or Nothing. Neither of them recognised him at first, however they eventually recalled his WCW World Heavyweight Championship reign but still refused to let him compete, instead, giving him a double Superkick.

In June 2021, Arquette announced he was retiring as a wrestler.

Other ventures 
In May 2007, Image Comics (in conjunction with Raw Studios) published David Arquette's the Tripper, which was adapted for the comic book medium by artist Nat Jones and writer Joe Harris, with whom Arquette shared writing duties. Propr Collection is a clothing line run by Arquette and Ben Harper. Arquette was briefly in a band by the name of Ear2000, who contributed a song to the Scream 2 soundtrack and Scream 3 soundtrack. The group, whose style blended hip hop and rock, has since broken up. Arquette has also been a part of Washington's Red Museum and recorded "Post Empire" with the band, which was released in 2011.

Arquette is part owner of Bootsy Bellows, an exclusive nightclub in Los Angeles. The club is named for Arquette's mother, a burlesque dancer who performed by that name.

David is a certified Bob Ross instructor, so he was trained in the landscape painting technique popularized by the famous painter.

Arquette purchased the rights to Bozo the Clown in 2021 and has plans to revive the character.

Championships and accomplishments
 Pro Wrestling Illustrated
 Ranked No. 453 of the top 500 singles wrestlers in the PWI 500 in 2019
 World Championship Wrestling
 WCW World Heavyweight Championship (1 time)
 WrestleCrap
 Gooker Award (2000) 
 Wrestling Observer Newsletter
 Most Disgusting Promotional Tactic (2000)

Luchas de Apuestas record

In the media
The band the Black Math Experiment released "You Cannot Kill David Arquette", a tongue in cheek song about Arquette's acting and wrestling career. Arquette himself helped promote the band on MTV's Total Request Live and during his promotional tour for The Tripper. He also used the band's music for the B-roll in the DVD of The Tripper. In South Park: Bigger, Longer & Uncut, when United States and Canada go to war, the countries begin bombing celebrities' houses, the Arquette family being one of them. Arquette has appeared on The Howard Stern Show many times, including multiple times as the show's celebrity intern.

Personal life
Arquette married actress Courteney Cox on June 12, 1999. They have a daughter, Coco Arquette, born in 2004. Jennifer Aniston is Coco's godmother. On October 11, 2010, the media announced that Arquette and Cox were having a trial separation, but "still love each other deeply." In June 2012, Arquette filed for divorce after nearly two years of separation from Cox. The divorce became final in May 2013. He started dating Entertainment Tonight correspondent Christina McLarty in 2011. They announced they were expecting their first child together in November 2013. McLarty gave birth to the couple's son in 2014. The couple announced their engagement in July 2014. They were married on April 12, 2015. McLarty gave birth to their second son in 2017.

Arquette checked into a rehabilitation center for treatment of "alcohol and other issues" on January 1, 2011. On April 8, 2011, Arquette announced on The Tonight Show with Jay Leno that he had reached the 100-day sober milestone. Later that year, Arquette said he had been sober for over nine months. In June 2012, while in Israel to film an episode of the travel show Trippin, Arquette belatedly celebrated his Bar Mitzvah at the Western Wall. The presiding rabbi was Shmuel Rabinovitch.

Filmography

Film

Television

Web

Music videos

Video games

Awards and nominations

See also
List of Jewish professional wrestlers

References

External links
 
 
 David Arquette interview
 The Mighty Vin interviews David Arquette
 

20th-century American male actors
21st-century American male actors
21st-century American male writers
Male actors from Virginia
American people of English descent
American people of French-Canadian descent
American people of Irish descent
American people of Swiss-German descent
American people of Russian-Jewish descent
American people of Polish-Jewish descent
American people of Scottish descent
American people of Welsh descent
American male film actors
Film producers from California
American male screenwriters
American male television actors
Television producers from California
Fairfax High School (Los Angeles) alumni
Jewish American male actors
Jewish American screenwriters
Participants in American reality television series
1971 births
Living people
David Arquette
Film directors from Virginia
American male professional wrestlers
American male video game actors
WCW World Heavyweight Champions
Jewish professional wrestlers
Film directors from Los Angeles
Screenwriters from California
Celebrities who have won professional wrestling championships